Deh Rud or Dehrud or Dehrood may refer to:
 Dehrud-e Olya, Bushehr Province
 Dehrud-e Sofla, Bushehr Province
 Dehrud, East Azerbaijan
 Deh Rud, Fars
 Deh Rud, Kerman
 Deh Rud, Razavi Khorasan
 Dehrud Rural District, in Bushehr Province